John Robert Prescott (1914–1989) was an English professional footballer who played as a winger. He was signed by several Football League clubs but only appeared for one, playing 31 times for Cardiff City.

References

1914 births
1989 deaths
English footballers
Everton F.C. players
Southport F.C. players
Marine F.C. players
Liverpool F.C. players
Cardiff City F.C. players
Hull City A.F.C. players
Plymouth Argyle F.C. players
English Football League players
Association football wingers
Footballers from Cardiff